Limnaecia callimitris is a moth of the family Cosmopterigidae. It is known from Australia, where it has been recorded from New South Wales.

References

Limnaecia
Moths described in 1897
Moths of Australia
Taxa named by Edward Meyrick